The Alegre River is a river of Mato Grosso state in western Brazil. It is a tributary of the Caçanje River, which in turn is a tributary of the Cuiabá River.

Course

The Alegre River flows northeast across the  Encontro das Águas State Park parallel to the Caçanje River, forms part of the eastern border of the park, then continues east to join the Caçanje just before that river enters the Cuiabá.
The region, rich in watercourses, supports diverse pantanal vegetation.

See also
List of rivers of Mato Grosso

References

Sources

Rivers of Mato Grosso